The women's 200 metres competition at the 2016 Summer Olympics in Rio de Janeiro, Brazil. The event was held at the Olympic Stadium between 15–17 August.

Summary
The fastest entrant in the field was 2015 World Champion Dafne Schippers of the Netherlands at 21.93 seconds for the season. The 2012 Olympic champion Allyson Felix was absent after failing to make the team at the United States Olympic Trials. Tori Bowie won that event and was the only other runner under 22 seconds that year, and also the only one to have beaten Schippers over 200 m that season. The lesser known Deajah Stevens and Jenna Prandini completed the American team (so the 2012 bronze medalist Carmelita Jeter also did not return). The Jamaican team was headed by 2015 World medallists Elaine Thompson and Veronica Campbell-Brown (the latter going for her third Olympic title). The 2012 Olympic runner-up Shelly-Ann Fraser-Pryce did not compete and focused on the Olympic 100 m finals. Trinidad and Tobago's Michelle-Lee Ahye and Dina Asher-Smith of Great Britain were the other top ten ranked athletes to enter the race.

In the semi-final round, both World Championship medalists #3 of all time, Schippers and #5 of all time, Thompson ran in the first heat.  Schippers won the race over Thompson, who ran her season best, but Thompson didn't look like she was running all out at the end while Schippers ran just .03 off her season best.  They led Deajah Stevens and Dina Asher-Smith to the time qualifiers.  Tori Bowie equalled Thompson's 22.13 in the third semi.

In the final, Thompson went out hard, making up the stagger on Ivet Lalova-Collio to her outside in the first 60 metres.  She had a one-metre lead over Schippers before the end of the turn.  Tori Bowie stumbled out of the blocks and was another metre back in a battle for fifth place with Dina Asher-Smith.  Schippers started to gain on Thompson towards the line but did not catch the winner. Two metres behind, Bowie won the bronze medal having overtaken Asher-Smith, Michelle-Lee Ahye and 10 metres before the finish line Marie Josée Ta Lou.		

The following evening the medals were presented by HM King Willem-Alexander of the Netherlands, IOC honorary member, Kenya and Sylvia Barlag, Council Member of the IAAF.

Format
The women's 200 m competition consisted of three rounds: a round one heats stage with nine races, three semifinal races, and a single final. Each race featured eight athletes. The top two in each heat progressed to the semifinals, as did the six fastest non-qualifiers. The top two finishers in each of the three semifinals qualified for the final with the two fastest non-qualifiers.

Records
Prior to the competition, the existing World and Olympic records were as follows.

The following national records were established during the competition:

Schedule
All times are Brasilia Time (UTC-3)

Results

Heats
Qualification rule: first 2 of each heat (Q) plus the 6 fastest times (q) qualified.

Heat 1

Heat 2

Heat 3

Heat 4

Heat 5

Heat 6

Heat 7

Heat 8

Heat 9

Semifinal
Qualification rules: First 2 in each heat (Q) and the next 2 fastest (q) advance to the Final.

Semifinal 1

Semifinal 2

Semifinal 3

Final

References

External links

Women's 200 metres
2016
2016 in women's athletics
Women's events at the 2016 Summer Olympics